Double Falls, is a waterfall located in the Silver Falls State Park at the east end of the city of Salem, in Marion County, in the U.S. state of Oregon. It is located on the west foothills where Mount Hood National Forest meets with the Middle Santiam Wilderness. Several prominent waterfalls are located in the Park along Trail of Ten Falls: South Falls, Drake Falls, Middle North Falls, and Winter Falls—among others.

Location 
Double Falls is the tallest of the waterfalls in Silver Falls State Park. It is located along the Trail of Ten Falls, along Canyon Trail, a few yards from Lower North Falls. Double Falls is not a product of Silver Creek but one of its tributaries, Hullt Creek located a short distance upstream from where it merges with the North Fork Silver Creek.

See also 
 List of waterfalls in Oregon

References 

Waterfalls of Oregon